"Bill Gates Must Die" is the third track on John Vanderslice's Mass Suicide Occult Figurines album released in 2000 on Barsuk Records.

Release 

On 9 February 2000, SF Weekly reported that Vanderslice had trouble releasing a number of promotional compact discs of the album Mass Suicide Occult Figurines featuring the track "Bill Gates Must Die". The Los Altos, California-based CD manufacturer Media Technology Services declined the release stating they took issue with the submitted cover art that spoofed the Microsoft logo. Sales associate of the company, Parvis Ghajar, said "By looking at [the CD], it implied that it was by Microsoft, and we didn't want to have Microsoft come after this." The song later appeared on the Fortune Records' local music compilation album Fortune Cookies.

Reception

Fortune Cookies release 
Reviewing the Fortune Records' compilation album Fortune Cookies, Allmusics Denise Sullivan called "Bill Gates Must Die" an "adolescent rock rant." CMJ New Music Monthly called the song "a soon-to-be hit." Ink 19s Jason Feifer called it one of the "a few sloppy mounds of music [...] that provides nothing particularly special or new."

Mass Suicide Occult Figurines release 
Allmusics Matt Fink reviewed "Bill Gates Must Die" with "the big bruising guitars [...] drive lyrics that are surprisingly free of attack on the multi-billionaire, instead telling the story of a man whose life is ruined by his obsessive internet use." In anticipation for Vanderslice's fourth album Cellar Door, CMJ New Music Monthlys Louis Miller described the song as "minor media sensation [...] complete with a made-up lawsuit and Vanderslice's claims of being pushed around by Microsoft goons." Pitchfork Medias Nick Mirov preferred the song "Speed Lab" over it stating that "allusions to paranoia about internet security loopholes and federal eavesdropping don't quite coalesce into the damning, righteous indictment of Microsoft that the title would suggest. For this particular computer geek, it's a bit of a letdown."

References 

2000 songs